Jordan Anagblah (1957–2014) was the Vice President of Ghana Football Association (GFA) and CEO of Might Jet.

Career 
He was the Vice President of Ghana Football Association and also served in various committees such as Chairman of Juvenile Football Committee, Emergency Committee Member and more.

Achievement 
He was part of the Ghanaian delegation that won the 2009 FIFA U-20 World Cup in Egypt.

Death 
He was sick and went for medical treatment in South Africa as a result of recovery, he later died at the Trust Hospital.

References 

1957 births
2014 deaths
Ghanaian football chairmen and investors
Ghana Football Association executives